The Duchess of Malfi is an opera in three acts by the British composer Stephen Oliver, based on the  eponymous play by John Webster.  Oliver originally wrote this opera, his ninth in 1971, at age 21, for a production at the Oxford Playhouse on commission from the Oxford University Opera Club.  The premiere was on November 23, 1971, with the following cast members:
 Jillian Crowe (The Duchess)
 Keith Jones (Antonio)
 Marion Milford (Julia)
 Peter Reynolds (The Cardinal)
 Stephen Oliver (Bosola)
 Anthony Sargent (Ferdinand)
 Alison Stamp (Cariola)
The conductor was Peter Robinson, and the director Julian Hope.

Oliver then rewrote the work, and the revised version received its US premiere at Santa Fe Opera on August 5, 1978.

Roles
The Duchess of Malfi  
The Cardinal 
Daniel de Bosola
Ferdinand, Duke of Calabria
Antonio Bologna
Delio
Castruccio 
Silvio 
Jester 
Cariola 
First Officer 
Second Officer 
A mad priest 
A mad astrologer 
A mad lawyer 
A mad doctor 
A doctor - Thomas Hammons

Synopsis
The play is set in the court of Malfi (Amalfi), Italy.  The young Duchess has recently been widowed, but her brothers, Ferdinand and the Cardinal, do not wish her to share their inheritance with a new spouse.  They thus forbid her from remarrying.  The brothers place Daniel de Bosola in her household as a spy.  Nonetheless, the Countess falls in love with Antonio, her steward, and they secretly marry.  Eventually, the brothers discover the marriage and imprison their sister.  In the climatic duel, Bosola and Ferdinand wind up killing each other.

References

External links
Chester Novello page on Stephen Oliver's The Duchess of Malfi
Cast list of the revised  1978 version, Santa Fe Opera

1971 operas
English-language operas
Operas
Operas based on plays
Operas set in Italy